Trunk Highway 60 (MN 60) is a  highway in southern Minnesota, which runs from Iowa Highway 60 at the Iowa state line (at Bigelow) and continues east-northeast to its eastern terminus at the Wisconsin state line (at Wabasha), where the route becomes Wisconsin Highway 25 upon crossing the Mississippi River.

Highway 60 is the only state highway in Minnesota which runs from one border to another.  The route runs in a general southwest-to-northeast direction.

Its western half forms a large portion of the four-lane expressway connecting Sioux City and the Twin Cities.

Route description
State Highway 60 serves as an east–west marked route in southern Minnesota between Worthington, Windom, St. James, Mankato, Faribault, Zumbrota, and Wabasha.

Highway 60 runs concurrently with U.S. Highway 59 south of and into Worthington; with U.S. Highway 71 in Windom; with State Highway 4 and State Highway 30 near St. James; with State Highway 15 near Madelia; and with U.S. Highway 169 in the Mankato area.

In North Mankato, Highway 60 moves from a concurrency with U.S. 169 to another one with U.S. Highway 14, continuing east on a four lane expressway until just past Eagle Lake, where the route leaves U.S. 14 and continues briefly north to Madison Lake then northeast towards the city of Faribault.  Highway 60 is a two lane highway at this point and for most of the rest of its way to Faribault and Wabasha.  The route has a junction with Interstate 35 in Faribault.

From Faribault, Highway 60 continues east towards Zumbrota, where it intersects U.S. Highway 52.  The route briefly runs concurrently with U.S. 52 around Zumbrota on a four lane expressway.  Highway 60 then leaves U.S. 52 and continues east-northeast towards Wabasha.  The route has junction with U.S. Highway 63 in Zumbro Falls and a junction with U.S. Highway 61 in Wabasha.  Highway 60 crosses the Mississippi River at Wabasha on the Wabasha-Nelson Bridge.  The route becomes Wisconsin Highway 25 upon crossing the river into Wisconsin.

History
State Highway 60 was formed in 1934 by connecting three Minnesota constitutional route segments together.  This formed a nearly border-to-border state highway, with its original termini at current U.S. 59 in Worthington and U.S. 61 at Wabasha.  The route was extended to the Iowa state line in 1937, and was authorized onto the bridge to Wisconsin in 1943.  The last gravel segment on this route was paved by 1960.  Expressway segments were completed from St. James to Lake Crystal in 1980, from Worthington to Windom in 2003, from Bigelow to Worthington in 2013, from Butterfield to St. James in 2014, and from Mountain Lake to Butterfield in 2015. The final four-lane expansion from Windom to Mountain Lake was completed in 2018.

Major intersections

References

060
Transportation in Nobles County, Minnesota
Transportation in Jackson County, Minnesota
Transportation in Cottonwood County, Minnesota
Transportation in Watonwan County, Minnesota
Transportation in Blue Earth County, Minnesota
Transportation in Nicollet County, Minnesota
Transportation in Le Sueur County, Minnesota
Transportation in Rice County, Minnesota
Transportation in Goodhue County, Minnesota
Transportation in Wabasha County, Minnesota
Transportation in Waseca County, Minnesota